Leland Pond consists of Upper Leland Pond and Lower Leland Pond which are connected by a short channel. The Pond is located by Pine Woods, New York. Fish species present in the pond include pumpkinseed sunfish, walleye, smallmouth bass, yellow perch, bluegill, pickerel, rock bass, rainbow trout, and largemouth bass.

References

Lakes of New York (state)
Lakes of Madison County, New York